Cold dish may refer to:
 a meal eaten cold
 The Cold Dish, a book by Craig Johnson nominated to the 2006 Dilys Award

See also 
 Vengeance Is a Dish Served Cold, a 1971 Italian Western film directed by Pasquale Squitieri